This is a list of Amarna letters –Text corpus, categorized by: Amarna letters–localities and their rulers. It includes countries, regions, and the cities or city-states. The regions are included in Canaan and the Levant.

EA:  'el Amarna' –(Akhenaten's capitol of Akhetaten).

The Amarna letters text corpus contains 382 numbered letters; there are "sub-Text corpora" in the letters, most notably the 68–letter corpus of Rib-Hadda of Gubla–(Byblos).

Localities / Rulers

Sub-corpus lists

No. 201–206: "Ready for marching orders (1–6)"
List of letters: EA 201–206.Actually authored by the same scribe. Also scribed EA 195, See: Prostration formula.

Leaders only in reference
Leaders that are only referred to in the letter corpus.

See also

Foreign relations of Egypt during the Amarna period

References

Moran, William L. The Amarna Letters. Johns Hopkins University Press, 1987, 1992. (softcover)

External links

Electronic version of the Amarna tablets

Phoenician cities